Pnigomenus kuscheli is a species of beetle in the family Cerambycidae, the only species in the genus Pnigomenus.

References

Callidiini
Monotypic beetle genera